The House of Maltzahn or Maltzan is the name of an ancient German noble family of the counts and barons von Maltza(h)n which originated from Mecklenburg, Germany, whose members occupied many important positions in the Duchy of Mecklenburg and in its successor states, in the Kingdom of Prussia and later in the German Empire. The family owned large properties in Mecklenburg, where they are now once again based on several estates.

Notable members

Maria von Maltzan (1909–1997), German Resistance member
Christian von Maltzahn, co-founder of Bruno Gmünder Verlag
Geoffrey von Maltzahn (born 1980), American biological engineer
Günther Freiherr von Maltzahn (1910–1953), German World War II flying ace
Heinrich von Maltzan, Baron zu Wartenburg und Penzlin (1826–1874), German traveller
Helmuth von Maltzahn (1840–1923), German finance minister and politician
Hermann von Maltzan (1843–1891), German malacologist
Joseph von Maltzahn (born 1978), British rower
Kathleen Maltzahn (born 1966), Australian author and political activist
Michael Maltzan, American architect
Mortimer von Maltzan (1793–1843), Prussian diplomat and foreign minister 
Vollrath von Maltzan (1899–1967), West German ambassador to France

German-language surnames